SS Carrabulle was a Design 1022 cargo ship built for the United States Shipping Board immediately after World War I.

History
She was laid down at yard number 1530 at the Philadelphia, Pennsylvania shipyard of the American International Shipbuilding Corporation, one of 110 Design 1022 cargo ships built for the United States Shipping Board. She was completed in 1920 and named Carrabulle.  In 1920, she was purchased by the American Fuel & Transportation Company and converted into a tanker by the Globe Shipbuilding Company in Baltimore with a 344,963 gallon capacity. In 1921, she was returned to the USSB. In 1922, she was purchased by the Curtis Bay Copper & Iron Works (Baltimore, Maryland). In 1923, she was purchased by the Cuban Distilling Company where she was utilized to transport blackstrap molasses, a byproduct of sugar refining, to the United States where it would be used to produce cattle feed, vinegar and denatured alcohol (in high demand due to Prohibition).

On May 26, 1942, she was torpedoed and sunk by German submarine  U-106 in the Gulf of Mexico. 22 men were killed and 18 were rescued by the US Type C1-B freighter Thompson Lykes.

References

Bibliography

External links
 EFC Design 1022: Illustrations

1920 ships
Ships built in Philadelphia
Merchant ships of the United States
Maritime incidents in May 1942
Design 1022 ships
Ships sunk by German submarines in World War II
Tankers of the United States